Naugle is a surname. Notable people with the surname include:

David Naugle, American Christian author and professor
Jim Naugle (born 1954), American real estate broker and politician

See also
Naugle House, historic house in Fair Lawn, New Jersey

Surnames of German origin